The Ludwigshafener Ruderverein von 1878 is the only rowing club in Ludwigshafen am Rhein, Germany and also one of the oldest sport club of the city.  It was founded in 1878 in Ludwigshafen and at the beginning of the year 2013 the rowing club has 289 members. The Ludwigshafener Ruderverein is member of the national rowing association of Rhineland-Palatinate and in the German rowing association.

History

Early years: 1878–2000 
The Ludwigshafener Ruderverein was founded at August 1, 1878. In the first meeting of members elected the 16 founding members C. H. Andersen to the first chairman of the club. Andersen was also the person who, as former member of a rowing club of Hamburg, push the foundation of the club.

In the first years the number of members rise an in 1898 the boatshouse in Ludwigshafen konnte eingeweiht werden. At the second olympic games in Paris in 1900 the coxed four of Ludwigshafen could win the bronze medal. Twelve years later in 1912 Hermann Wilker, Otto Fickeisen, Rudolf Fickeisen, Albert Arnheiter and cox Otto Maier could win the gold medal at the olympic games in Stockholm. The World War I stopped the development of the rowing club and the normal rowing life started first in 1921.

In 1936 Paul Söllner won the next gold medal in the coxed four in cooperation with rowers from the rowing club of Mannheim. In the World War II 57 members of the club fallen and the boatshouse were destroyed completely by the air attacks on the city of Ludwigshafen and the chemical plants in Ludwigshafen.

After the war the Ludwigshafener Ruderverein was the first refounded rowing club in the French occupation zone. The boatshouse must be rebuilt and in 1947 the first win on a national regatta could announced.

In 1972 Alois Bierl win the gold medal at the olympic games in Munich in the coxed four and Winfried Ringwald receipt the fifth place with the German eight.

Later in the nineties the woman rowing was very successful. Beate Brühe receipt together with Andrea Klapeck the fourth place at the world championships 1991 in the quadruple four. Three years later Andrea Klapeck became worldchampion in the eight and was also member of the German rowing crew for the olympic games in 1996 in Atlanta. In the division of the woman lightweights Karin Stephan achieved at the worldchampionsships in 1998 the silver medal and in 2000 the gold medal.

2013–present 
In the years 2000 to 2005 Sandra Schnitzer, Anja Hannöver and Martin and Jochen Kühner were the most successful athletes on national and international competitions. In the recent past the rowing club of Ludwigshafen focused on training and education of young rowers and could send respectively one young athlete to the World Rowing Junior Championships in 2010 and 2011.

In the years 2009 and 2010 the Ludwigshafener Ruderverein provided in cooperation with the Mannheimer Ruderclub an eight for the German premier league of rowing.

Furthermore the club was very successful in the masters division. In the last years Detlev Jantz and Jürgen Hock could win many titles at the FISA World Rowing Masters and crews from the Ludwigshafener Ruderverein could achieve one victory in 2012 and good positions in the other years at the longest non-stop rowing competition of the world, the Tour du Lac Léman.

Location 

The boatshouse of the Ludwigshafener Ruderverein is located in the center of Ludwigshafen beside the river Rhine. The nearby located harbor "Luitpoldhafen" will be used for training beginners and work out.

Since April 2006 in the boatshouse is reside the italien restaurant “Ristorante Della Bona” and after the reconstruction of the building in 2007 and 2008 there is an information area in the upper floor for the arising district “Rheinufer Süd” around the club.

An ample area near Altrip also belongs to the club. It is used especially for training beginners and for leisure activities of the club.

Honours

Olympic Games

World Rowing Championships

References

External links 
 Website of the rowing club

Rowing clubs in Germany
Sports clubs established in 1878
Sport in Ludwigshafen
1878 establishments in Germany